Pakubuwono VI (26 April 1807, in Surakarta, Central Java – 2 June 1849, in Ambon, Moluccas) (also transliterated Pakubuwana VI) was the sixth Susuhunan (ruler) of Surakarta from 1823 to 1830 when he was deposed by the Dutch and exiled.

References
Miksic, John N. (general ed.), et al. (2006)  Karaton Surakarta. A look into the court of Surakarta Hadiningrat, central Java (First published: 'By the will of His Serene Highness Paku Buwono XII'. Surakarta: Yayasan Pawiyatan Kabudayan Karaton Surakarta, 2004)  Marshall Cavendish Editions  Singapore  

Burials at Imogiri
Susuhunan of Surakarta
National Heroes of Indonesia
1807 births
1849 deaths
Indonesian royalty